Shri C.N.P.F. Arts and D.N. Science College, Dabhoi, also known as Dabhoi Science College, established in 1958, is one of the oldest general degree colleges in Dabhoi, Vadodara, Gujarat. It  was earlier affiliated to Gujarat University, Since 2015 it is affiliated with Shri Govind Guru University, Godhara and offers undergraduate and post graduate courses in science and arts.

Majors
Chemistry
Physics 
Mathematics
Botany
English
Gujarati
Economics
Sanskrit
Philosophy
Psychology

Accreditation
Shri C.N.P.F. Arts and D.N. Science College, Dabhoi was accredited by the National Assessment and Accreditation Council (NAAC).

References

External links
http://www.dabhoicollege.org/index.html

Colleges affiliated to Gujarat University
Universities and colleges in Gujarat
Gujarat University
Educational institutions established in 1958
1958 establishments in Bombay State